Richard Thomas (December 30, 1744January 19, 1832) was an American politician from Pennsylvania who served as a Federalist member of the United States House of Representatives from Pennsylvania's 3rd congressional district from 1795 to 1801. He also served in the Pennsylvania State Senate for the 9th Senatorial District from 1791 to 1793.

Early life and education
Thomas was born in West Whiteland Township in the Province of Pennsylvania and was educated at home by private teachers. He served in the American Revolutionary War as colonel of the First Regiment, Chester County Volunteers of the Pennsylvania militia.

Career
Thomas became a member of the American Philosophical Society in 1771 and was later elected to the Pennsylvania State Senate for the 9th Senatorial District serving from 1791 to 1793.

In 1793, he was appointed a brigadier-general of militia by Governor Thomas Mifflin but declined to accept the role.

He was elected as a Federalist to the Fourth, Fifth, and Sixth Congresses, serving from March 4, 1795 to March 3, 1801. He engaged in agricultural pursuits and constructed Ivy Cottage, Whitford Lodge, and Whitford Hall in West Whiteland Township.

Thomas died in Philadelphia in 1832 and is buried at the Friends Western Burial Ground in Philadelphia.

Personal life
Thomas married Thomazine Downing, grand-daughter of Thomas Downing, founder of Downingtown, Pennsylvania.

References

The Political Graveyard

1744 births
1832 deaths
18th-century American politicians
19th-century American politicians
Pennsylvania militiamen in the American Revolution
Pennsylvania state senators
People from Chester County, Pennsylvania
People of colonial Pennsylvania
Federalist Party members of the United States House of Representatives from Pennsylvania
Members of the American Philosophical Society